Eva Kolenová (born 1 May 1985) is a Slovak football defender currently playing for SKV Altenmarkt in Austria's ÖFB-Frauenliga. She has played the UEFA Women's Cup with MŠK Žiar nad Hronom and Slovan Duslo Šaľa, and she has been a member of the Slovakia women's national team. In 2010 and 2011 she was named the best Slovak player of the year.

References

External links 
 

1985 births
Living people
Women's association football defenders
Slovak women's footballers
Slovakia women's international footballers
FK Slovan Duslo Šaľa (women) players
Expatriate women's footballers in Austria
Slovak expatriate sportspeople in Austria
ÖFB-Frauenliga players
People from Bánovce nad Bebravou
Sportspeople from the Trenčín Region